Scaevola striata, commonly known as royal robe, is a species of flowering plant in the family Goodeniaceae. It has blue fan-shaped flowers, and is endemic to Western Australia.

Description

Taxonomy and naming
Scaevola striata was first formally described 1810 by Robert Brown and the description was published in Prodromus florae Novae Hollandiae et insulae Van-Diemen, exhibens characteres plantarum quas annis 1802-1805. The specific epithet ("striata") refers to the wings of the corolla.

Distribution and habitat
Royal robe grows on sand plains and ridges in wet areas on the south coast of Western Australia.

References

striata
Eudicots of Western Australia
Asterales of Australia
Plants described in 1810